Scott Township is one of twenty townships in Fayette County, Iowa, USA.  As of the 2010 census, its population was 254.

Geography
According to the United States Census Bureau, Scott Township covers an area of 36.23 square miles (93.84 square kilometers); of this, 36.23 square miles (93.82 square kilometers, 99.98 percent) is land and 0.01 square miles (0.02 square kilometers, 0.02 percent) is water.

Cities, towns, villages
 Stanley (partial)

Unincorporated towns
 Scott at 
(This list is based on USGS data and may include former settlements.)

Adjacent townships
 Smithfield Township (north)
 Fairfield Township (northeast)
 Putnam Township (east)
 Madison Township, Buchanan County (southeast)
 Buffalo Township, Buchanan County (south)
 Hazleton Township, Buchanan County (southwest)
 Jefferson Township (west)
 Harlan Township (northwest)

Major highways
  Iowa Highway 3

School districts
 Oelwein Community School District
 Starmont Community School District

Political districts
 Iowa's 1st congressional district
 State House District 24
 State Senate District 12

References
 United States Census Bureau 2008 TIGER/Line Shapefiles
 United States Board on Geographic Names (GNIS)
 United States National Atlas

External links
 US-Counties.com
 City-Data.com

Townships in Fayette County, Iowa
Townships in Iowa